Lu Ying (陆滢, Lù Yíng, born 22 January 1989) is a Chinese competitive swimmer. She competed for China at the 2012 Summer Olympics in London and the 2016 Olympics in Rio.  She won a silver medal in the women's 100 metre butterfly at the 2012 Summer Olympics.

References

External links
 
 Profile at gz2010.cn

Living people
1989 births
Chinese female butterfly swimmers
Swimmers from Shanghai
World Aquatics Championships medalists in swimming
Swimmers at the 2012 Summer Olympics
Swimmers at the 2016 Summer Olympics
Olympic swimmers of China
Olympic silver medalists for China
Medalists at the FINA World Swimming Championships (25 m)
Asian Games medalists in swimming
Swimmers at the 2010 Asian Games
Medalists at the 2012 Summer Olympics
Swimmers at the 2014 Asian Games
Asian Games bronze medalists for China
Olympic silver medalists in swimming
Universiade medalists in swimming
Medalists at the 2010 Asian Games
World Games gold medalists
Competitors at the 2009 World Games
Universiade gold medalists for China
Universiade bronze medalists for China
Chinese lifesaving athletes
Medalists at the 2011 Summer Universiade
Medalists at the 2015 Summer Universiade
21st-century Chinese women